Tout was an online social networking service and microblogging service that enabled its users to send and view 15-second videos, known as "touts." The service's core technology was created at SRI International by Michael Downing based on two patents owned by that company.

In April 2010, Tout spun off as its own company with SRI taking an equity stake. Tout gained popularity in June 2011 when basketball player Shaquille O'Neal used the service to announce his retirement. By early 2012, Tout had received over 12 million visitors and 75 million Touts had been shared by users of the service.

Investors

On July 11, 2012, the company announced a $13.4 million round of Series B funding; professional wrestling promotion WWE participated in the funding round, and announced a two-year strategic partnership with the company. During WWE CEO Vince McMahon's quarterly conference call with investors held on the morning of August 2, WWE CFO George Barrios disclosed the amount of that investment to have been $5 million, but would not disclose what percentage of the company that sum represents. Stephanie McMahon, CBO of WWE, would appear on the Board of Directors for Tout. 

As part of the strategic partnership, WWE subsequently promoted Tout via its platforms, including encouraging its talent to use the service, and showcasing posts by viewers and WWE talent during segments of its television programs.

See also
 Keek
 Vine (service)

References

External links

Social media companies of the United States
Companies based in San Francisco
Technology companies based in the San Francisco Bay Area
Internet properties established in 2010
American companies established in 2010
2010 establishments in California
Privately held companies based in California